Kamran Baghirov Mammad oglu (24 January 1933 – 25 October 2000), was the 12th First Secretary of Azerbaijan Communist Party.

Biography
From 3 December 1982, through 21 May 1988, Baghirov served as the First Secretary of the Central Committee of the Communist Party of Azerbaijan SSR. After start and escalation of the Nagorno-Karabakh conflict, he was replaced by Abdurrahman Vazirov. Baghirov is often blamed for deterioration of the economy of Azerbaijan which was boosted when his predecessor Heydar Aliyev was in office. He was also blamed for widespread corruption. From February 1988 when the conflict around Nagorno-Karabakh Autonomous Oblast (NKAO) started, until his removal from office, Baghirov has been considered as an inactive leader who allowed exodus of ethnic Azerbaijanis from Armenia and Nagorno-Karabakh, and inability to prevent the escalation of the conflict. Baghirov was bashed for his passiveness in allowing the NKAO's party leader, Boris Kevorkov to be replaced by Armenian nationalist, Genrikh Poghosyan subsequently causing the direct rule of NKAO by Moscow

References

1933 births
2000 deaths
Politicians from Shusha
First secretaries of the Azerbaijan Communist Party
Central Committee of the Communist Party of the Soviet Union members
Tenth convocation members of the Soviet of the Union
Eleventh convocation members of the Soviet of the Union
Recipients of the Order of Lenin
Recipients of the Order of the Red Banner of Labour
Burials at II Alley of Honor